There have been three baronetcies created for persons with the surname Tyrwhitt (pronounced "Tirrit"), one in the Baronetage of England and two in the Baronetage of the United Kingdom.

The Tyrwhitt Baronetcy, of Stainfield in the County of Lincoln, was created in the Baronetage of England on 29 June 1611 for Philip Tyrwhitt. The fourth Baronet represented Grimsby in the House of Commons. The fifth and sixth Baronets both sat as Members of Parliament for Lincoln. The title became extinct on the latter's death in 1760.

The Tyrwhitt Baronetcy, of Stanley Hall in the County of Shropshire, was created in the Baronetage of the United Kingdom on 3 October 1808. For more information on this creation, see the Baron Berners.

The Tyrwhitt Baronetcy, of Terschelling and of Oxford, was created in the Baronetage of the United Kingdom on 13 December 1919 for the naval commander Reginald Tyrwhitt. He was a descendant of John Tyrwhitt, brother of the first Baronet of the 1808 creation. In 1934 Tyrwhitt was promoted to Admiral of the Fleet. The second Baronet was an admiral in the Royal Navy and served as Second Sea Lord from 1959 to 1961.  The third baronet served in the British Army as a Guardsman with Irish Guards, and as an officer in the Royal Artillery. He was appointed a Deputy Lieutenant of Lincolnshire in 2016.

Tyrwhitt baronets, of Stainfield (1611)

Sir Philip Tyrwhitt, 1st Baronet (died 1624)
Sir Edward Tyrwhitt, 2nd Baronet (1577–1628)
Sir Philip Tyrwhitt, 3rd Baronet (1598–)
Sir Philip Tyrwhitt, 4th Baronet (1633–1688)
Sir John Tyrwhitt, 5th Baronet (c. 1663–1741)
Sir John de la Fountain Tyrwhitt, 6th Baronet (1708–1760)

Tyrwhitt baronets, of Stanley Hall (1808)
see the Baron Berners

Tyrwhitt baronets, of Terschelling and Oxford (1919)
Sir Reginald Yorke Tyrwhitt, 1st Baronet (1870–1951)
Sir St John Reginald Joseph Tyrwhitt, 2nd Baronet (1905–1961)
Sir Reginald Thomas Newman Tyrwhitt, 3rd Baronet (born 1947)

References

Kidd, Charles, Williamson, David (editors). Debrett's Peerage and Baronetage (1990 edition). New York: St Martin's Press, 1990.

 

Baronetcies in the Baronetage of the United Kingdom
Extinct baronetcies in the Baronetage of England
Extinct baronetcies in the Baronetage of the United Kingdom